The Istituto Nazionale di Alta Matematica Francesco Severi, abbreviated as INdAM, is a government created non-profit research institution whose main purpose is to promote research in the field of mathematics and its applications and the diffusion of higher mathematical education in Italy. 

Its founder and first president, later nominated life president, was Francesco Severi, who exerted also a major influence on the creation of the institute.

History 
The institute was established on 13 July 1939 as the Royal National Institute of High Mathematics, with a law signed by Vittorio Emanuele III, Benito Mussolini, Paolo Thaon di Revel and Giuseppe Bottai. Its foundation is largely due to the action of Francesco Severi, possibly starting from an idea by Luigi Fantappié. The first Scientific Council was made up of Francesco Severi (president), Luigi Fantappiè, Giulio Krall, Enrico Bompiani and Mauro Picone. In 1946, following the Italian referendum, the adjective "Royal" was removed from its name. In 1976 it assumed the current official name of National Institute of High Mathematics "Francesco Severi". 

From the beginning, the main activity of INdAM has been the organisation of advanced courses aimed at gifted young people. In this way, the Institute has contributed significantly to the education of many Italian mathematicians, also due to the opportunities offered to them to come into contact with some of the leading international mathematicians.

The Italian mathematicians who worked as professors and/or were students at INdAM included Antonio Signorini, Gianfranco Cimmino, Iacopo Barsotti, Luigi Amerio, Beniamino Segre, Enzo Martinelli, Renato Caccioppoli, Fabio Conforto, Giovanni Battista Rizza, Aldo Andreotti, Edoardo Vesentini, Gaetano Fichera, Ennio De Giorgi, Claudio Procesi, Maurizio Cornalba, Alessandro Figà-Talamanca, Enrico Giusti, Antonio Ambrosetti, Paolo Marcellini, Enrico Bombieri, Corrado De Concini, Nicola Fusco and Mario Pulvirenti.

The foreign mathematicians included Leonard Roth, Helmut Hasse, Wilhelm Blaschke, Paul Dubreil, Lucien Godeaux, Luitzen Brouwer, Jean Leray, Wacław Sierpiński, Wolfgang Gröbner, Heinz Hopf, Erich Kähler, Oskar Zariski, Georges De Rham, Max Deuring, Bartel Leendert Van der Waerden, Kazimierz Kuratowski, John Lighton Synge, Louis Mordell, Rolf Nevanlinna, Richard von Mises, Ernst Witt, Henri Cartan, Jacques Tits, Jean Dieudonné, Victor Kac, Francis Clarke.

INdAM Research Groups 
The National Research Groups were originally part of the National Research Council (CNR); among the directors of the Research Groups in that period there are Vinicio Boffi, Roberto Conti and Ilio Galligani. Since 1999 the National Research Groups have been an integral part of the INdAM. 

These are four National Research Groups with a staff of more than 2,500 researchers. The Groups carry out research in mathematics by financing research projects, inviting qualified foreign researchers to Italy, and financing stays abroad of young Italian researchers to carry out collaborative research at universities and other institutions. In particular, the Groups promote, coordinate and support the research activities of its members through: a) the Visiting Professors program; b) the financial contributions to the organisation of conferences; c) the reimbursement of travel expenses in Italy and abroad; d) the funding of Research and Training Projects. 

The four National Research Groups of the INdAM are the following:

National Group for Mathematical Analysis, Probability and their Applications (GNAMPA) 
The GNAMPA group supports and coordinates research in Differential Equations and Dynamical Systems; Variational Calculus and Optimisation; Real Analysis, Measure theory and Probability; and Functional and Harmonic Analysis.

National Group for Numerical Analysis (GNCS) 
The GNCS group supports and coordinates research in Numerical Analysis and basic research in Computer Science.

National Group for Mathematical Physics (GNFM) 
The GNFM group supports and coordinates research in Mechanics of discrete systems; Fluid Mechanics; Continuum Mechanics; Diffusion and transport problems; and Relativity and Field theory.

National Group for Algebraic and Geometric Structures and their Applications (GNSAGA) 
The GNSAGA group supports and coordinates research in Differential Geometry; Complex geometry and Topology; Algebraic Geometry and Commutative Algebra; and Mathematical Logic and applications.

Notes

References

Historical references
.
. This is a monographic fascicle published on the "Bollettino della Unione Matematica Italiana", describing the history of the "Istituto Nazionale di Alta Matematica Francesco Severi" from its foundation in 1939 to 2003: it was written by Gino Roghi and includes a presentation by Salvatore Coen and a preface by Corrado De Concini. It is almost exclusively based on sources from the institute archives: the wealth and variety of materials included, jointly with its appendices and indexes, make this monograph a useful reference not only for the history of the institute itself, but also for the history of many mathematicians who taught or followed the institute courses or simply worked there.
. This work describes the research activity at the Sapienza University of Rome and at the (at that time newly created) "Istituto Nazionale di Alta Matematica Francesco Severi"  from the end of the thirties to the early forties of the 20th century.

General references
. The 1992 issued law for the reordering of the institute, modified by the 6th comma of article 13 of the legislative decree , defining its purposes, the structure of its basic activities in the form of tree-year plans, its governing and operative structures: a PDF copy of the amended law is also available from the institute web site.
. The current Statute of the institute, available also as a PDF document from the institute web site.
. The legislative decree 19 of 30 January 1999 on the reordering of the CNR, whose 6th comma of article 13 amends the  law for the reordering of the institute.

External links
. The official website of the Istituto Nazionale di Alta Matematica Francesco Severi.

Mathematical institutes
Scientific organizations established in 1939
Research institutes in Italy
1939 establishments in Italy